Abdelrahman Al-Masatfa (born 26 May 1996) is a Jordanian karateka. He won one of the bronze medals in the men's 67 kg event at the 2020 Summer Olympics held in Tokyo, Japan. He is also a two-time medalist at the Asian Games and a six-time medalist, including two gold medals, at the Asian Karate Championships.

Career 

He won the silver medal in the men's kumite 60 kg event at the 2014 Asian Games in Incheon, South Korea. He won one of the bronze medals in the men's kumite 67 kg at the 2018 Asian Games held in Jakarta, Indonesia.

He won the gold medal in his event at the 2018 Asian Karate Championships held in Amman, Jordan. In 2019, he won one of the bronze medals in his event at the Asian Karate Championships held in Tashkent, Uzbekistan.

He qualified at the World Olympic Qualification Tournament in Paris, France to represent Jordan at the 2020 Summer Olympics in Tokyo, Japan. At the Olympics, he won one of the bronze medals in the men's 67 kg event. He was also the flag bearer for Jordan during the closing ceremony.

In December 2021, he won one of the bronze medals in his event at the Asian Karate Championships held in Almaty, Kazakhstan. He also won one of the bronze medals in the men's team kumite event.

He won one of the bronze medals in the men's 67 kg event at the 2021 Islamic Solidarity Games held in Konya, Turkey.

Achievements

References

External links 

 
 

1996 births
Living people
Place of birth missing (living people)
Jordanian male karateka
Karateka at the 2014 Asian Games
Karateka at the 2018 Asian Games
Medalists at the 2014 Asian Games
Medalists at the 2018 Asian Games
Asian Games medalists in karate
Asian Games silver medalists for Jordan
Asian Games bronze medalists for Jordan
Karateka at the 2020 Summer Olympics
Olympic medalists in karate
Medalists at the 2020 Summer Olympics
Olympic bronze medalists for Jordan
Olympic karateka of Jordan
Islamic Solidarity Games medalists in karate
Islamic Solidarity Games competitors for Jordan
21st-century Jordanian people